Sergeyevskaya is a rural locality (a village) in Rochegodskoye Rural Settlement of Vinogradovsky District, Arkhangelsk Oblast, Russia. The population was 17 as of 2010.

Geography 
Sergeyevskaya is located 64 km southeast of Bereznik (the district's administrative centre) by road. Topsa is the nearest rural locality.

References 

Rural localities in Vinogradovsky District